Jamhuuriya Team Banooni is a Somali football club based in Gaalkacyo, Somalia and they currently play in the Somali Third Division

Achievements 
Jamhuuriya TB reached the final of the Somalia cup, losing to Elman FC, and were the runner up of the 2017 Somalia cup

Football clubs in Somalia